The Indian National Committee for Space Research (INCOSPAR) was established by India's first prime minister Pandit Jawaharlal Nehru under the Department of Atomic Energy (DAE) in 1962, on the urging of scientist Vikram Sarabhai, recognising the need in space research. It committed to formulate the Indian Space Programme. At the time, the committee was part of the Tata Institute of Fundamental Research. The committee took over the responsibilities of the Department of Atomic Energy in space science and research. The then director of the DAE, Dr. Homi Bhabha, was instrumental in creation of the committee.

INCOSPAR took the decision to set up Thumba Equatorial Rocket Launching Station (TERLS) at Thumba on the southern tip of India.  IOFS officers were drawn from the indian Ordnance Factories to harness their knowledge of propellants and advanced light materials used to build rockets. H.G.S. Murthy, an IOFS officer, was appointed the first director of the Thumba Equatorial Rocket Launching Station, where sounding rockets were fired, marking the start of upper atmospheric research in India. An indigenous series of sounding rockets named Rohini was subsequently developed and started undergoing launches from 1967 onwards.  Waman Dattatreya Patwardhan, another IOFS officer, developed the propellant for the rockets. Dr. A. P. J. Abdul Kalam (who later became the President of India) was amongst the initial team of rocket engineers forming the INCOSPAR.

INCOSPAR was superseded by the Indian Space Research Organisation (ISRO) in 1969.

References

Space programme of India